Hurtt is a surname. Notable people with the surname include:

 Clint Hurtt (born 1978), American football coach
 Justin Hurtt (born 1988), American basketball player
 Harold Hurtt, American police chief
 Phil Hurtt, American musician
 Rob Hurtt (born 1944), American politician

See also
Hurt (disambiguation)